Willgottheim is a commune in the Bas-Rhin department in Grand Est in north-eastern France.

On 1 July 1972, Willgottheim merged with the commune of Wœllenheim.

Population

See also
Communes of the Bas-Rhin department
Kochersberg

References

Communes of Bas-Rhin